Huisman is an occupational surname of Dutch origin. "Huisman" translates to houseman, and is an archaic term for a farmer who owns his farm. Common variations are Huismann, Huismans, Huijsman, Huijsmans, Huysman, and Huysmans. People with this surname include:
Dave Huismans, a.k.a. 2562 (b. 1979), Dutch musician
Duncan Huisman (b. 1971), Dutch race car driver
Emma Huismans (b. 1947), Dutch-born Afrikaans writer, journalist, and activist 
 (1889-1957), French politician and founder of the Cannes Film Festival
Hellen Huisman (1937–2012), Dutch voice actor
Henny Huisman (b. 1951), Dutch television presenter
 (born 1943), Dutch sculptor
Johannes Alphonsus Huisman (1919-2003), Dutch philologist
Jopie Huisman (1922–2000), Dutch painter.
Josje Huisman (b. 1986), Dutch singer and dancer
Justin Huisman (b. 1979), American baseball pitcher
Kai Huisman (b. 1995), Dutch footballer
 (born 1983), Dutch squash player
Mariska Huisman (b. 1983), Dutch speedskater
Maurice Huisman (1912–1993), Belgian Opera director
Michiel Huisman (b. 1981), Dutch film and television actor
Patrick Huisman (b. 1966), Dutch race car driver
Rick Huisman (b. 1969), American baseball player
Richard Allen Huisman (born 1969), American professional baseball player
Robin Huisman de Jong (b. 1988), Dutch footballer
Roelof Huisman (1443–1485), Dutch humanist scholar better known as Rodolphus Agricola
Sjoerd Huisman (1986–2013), Dutch speed skater
Tina Huisman (born 1973), Dutch short track speed skater and long track speed skater
 (b. 1951), German journalist and film maker

See also
Huysmans
De Huisman, a windmill at the Zaanse Schans 
Royal Huisman, Dutch sailing yachts shipyard named after its founder, Jan Huisman

Dutch-language surnames
Occupational surnames